Scott is an unincorporated community in Johnson County, in the U.S. state of Georgia.

History
A post office called Scott was established in 1897, and remained in operation until 1957. Scott also had a hospital, train station, jail, and a grocery store. It is unknown why the name "Scott" was applied to this place.

The Georgia General Assembly incorporated Scott as a town in 1904. The town's municipal charter was repealed in 1995.

References

Former municipalities in Georgia (U.S. state)
Unincorporated communities in Georgia (U.S. state)
Unincorporated communities in Johnson County, Georgia
Populated places disestablished in 1995